Isaac Quaynor (born 15 January 2000) is a professional Australian rules footballer with Ghanaian descent who plays for the Collingwood Football Club in the Australian Football League (AFL).

Early life
Quaynor participated in the Auskick program at Doncaster East, Victoria. He played junior football with the Doncaster East Football Club with future Collingwood teammate Tom Phillips. He then joined Oakleigh Chargers, where he was coached by Anthony Phillips, Tom's father. Quaynor played junior football for the Templestowe Football Club and for Bulleen-Templestowe Football Club in the Yarra Junior Football League. In 2018, Quaynor was runner-up for Oakleigh Chargers best and fairest award, which was won by Jack Ross. He represented Vic Metro at the 2018 AFL Under 18 Championships and was selected for the All-Australian team, despite missing the match against Vic County due to a rib fracture. Quaynor played 10 games for Collingwood's Victorian Football League before his AFL debut, averaging 19.1 disposals and 3.6 tackles.

AFL career
Quaynor was part of Collingwood's Next Generation Academy and won the goal kicking test at the Draft Combine. The club drafted him to their AFL squad with the 13th draft pick of the 2018 AFL draft. As Collingwood's first pick of the draft, he wore the number 35 guernsey in his first season. Quaynor made his AFL debut in Collingwood's loss against Hawthorn in the 16th round of the 2019 AFL season. In the 17th round of the 2020 AFL season, Quaynor was nominated for the AFL Rising Star award.

Statistics
Updated to the end of the 2022 season.

|-
| 2019 ||  || 35
| 4 || 0 || 0 || 35 || 23 || 58 || 18 || 10 || 0 || 0 || 8.8 || 5.6 || 14.5 || 4.5 || 2.5
|- 
| 2020 ||  || 3
| 11 || 0 || 0 || 74 || 74 || 148 || 33 || 25 || 0 || 0 || 6.7 || 6.7 || 13.5 || 3.0 || 2.3
|-
| 2021 ||  || 3
| 20 || 1 || 2 || 221 || 140 || 361 || 95 || 45 || 0.1 || 0.1 || 11.1 || 7.0 || 18.1 || 4.8 || 2.3
|-
| 2022 ||  || 3
| 24 || 2 || 3 || 199 || 134 || 333 || 93 || 70 || 0.1 || 0.1 || 8.3 || 5.6 || 13.9 || 3.9 || 2.9
|- class=sortbottom
! colspan=3 | Career
! 59 !! 3 !! 5 !! 529 !! 371 !! 900 !! 239 !! 150 !! 0.1 !! 0.1 !! 9.0 !! 6.3 !! 15.3 !! 4.1 !! 2.5
|}

Notes

Honours and achievements
Individual
 AFL Rising Star nominee: 2020 (round 17)

Personal life
Quaynor was born in Melbourne and grew up in Doncaster East, supporting Collingwood since young, idolising Scott Pendlebury, and even sitting behind the Cheer Squad during the 2018 AFL Grand Final. His father, Yaw, is of Akyem Abuakwa from Ghana, where his mother, Kate, met him during a music trip. He is the oldest of six siblings and went to school at Doncaster Gardens Primary School and East Doncaster Secondary College, despite Camberwell Grammar School offering him a scholarship. Quaynor has also played soccer and basketball. He modelled his game on Western Bulldogs player Jason Johannisen and Melbourne defender Neville Jetta.

References

External links

2000 births
Living people
Collingwood Football Club players
Australian rules footballers from Melbourne
Australian people of Ghanaian descent
People from Doncaster, Victoria